Ultrasoft was a computer game developer and computer game publisher located in Bratislava, Slovakia. The company specialised in the development and publishing of games for the ZX Spectrum home computer. With over 40 titles published, its most successful including the platform game Towdie and puzzle games Atomix and Hexagonia – Atomix 2. Ultrasoft also acted as an exclusive distributor within the territory of Czechoslovakia for Ocean Software  game software house based in the UK. Apart from computer games, the company also published a dozen or so non-game titles, mostly for learning foreign languages, as well as text, image, sound and music editors.

The company was founded by Louis Wittek in 1989, and dissolved in 1998.

Published games

Other published titles 
 Baby Mantrik (English for children)
 Datalog 2 (Database)
 DTP Machine Utility (DTP editor)
 DTP Machine Professional Pack (Image/Text/DTP editor)
 Mantrik Anglicky (Learning English)
 Mantrik Nemecky (Learning German)
 Mantrik Editor – Professor (Create your own lessons for Mantrik)
 Mrs08E (ZX Spectrum Assembler editor)
 ScreenMachine (Image editor)
 SoundTracker (Music editor)
 TextMachine (Text editor)
 Tuition (Sinclair BASIC for beginners)
 ZX-7 (Music & Sound editor)

Bit magazine 

Between 1991–1994 Ultrasoft also published a specialised monthly magazine Bit, aimed at owners of home computers and dealing with computer games in particular.

References

External links 
 Ultrasoft s.r.o. at Moby Games
 Ultrasoft s.r.o. at Game Spot
 Ultrasoft at ZX Spectrum
 Ultrasoft  at ZX Spectrum Reviews
 Ultrasoft at Game FAQs
 Ultrasoft at GAME-OST
 Ultrasoft at Games Database
 Ultrasoft at RetroCpu
 Ultrasoft at Adventureland
 Ultrasoft - complete overview of games  at ZX Spectrum Games
 Hexagonia at World of Spectrum
 Towdie at World of Spectrum
 Towdie at ZX Art
 Komando 2 - screenshots at Moby Games
 Watch Kliatba Noci (Curse of the Night) on YouTube
 Bit Magazine online at Old Games
 Bit Magazine archive at ZX Magazin

Defunct video game companies of Slovakia
Video game companies established in 1989
Video game companies disestablished in 1998
ZX Spectrum games